Shareef Cousin (born 1979) is an African-American man from New Orleans who was convicted of the first-degree murder of Michael Gerardi in 1996 and sentenced to death as a juvenile in Louisiana.  At age 17, he became the youngest condemned convict to be put on death row in Louisiana, and one of the youngest in the United States.

Cousin was convicted almost solely on the basis of one eyewitness identification provided by a woman who was the date of the victim, who said he was one of three black males who accosted them. No physical evidence linked him to the crime scene. A number of other witnesses insisted Cousin had been playing in a youth league basketball game at the time of the murder. A video of the game was also presented at court.

During appeals, a number of instances of prosecutorial misconduct and suppression of exculpatory evidence were discovered in the case. The primary eyewitness initially told police she could not identify the shooter as she wasn't wearing her glasses, but this statement was not disclosed to the defense. 

Another prosecution witness testified that he was coerced to falsely implicate Cousin in exchange for a reduced sentence on other charges. Cousin's conviction and death sentence were  overturned in 1998. The DA dropped the case, saying there was not sufficient evidence for a second trial. No one else has been prosecuted for the murder.

The case of Shareef Cousin is frequently cited as an example of the unreliable nature of eyewitness testimony.

Crime
On March 2, 1995, Michael Gerardi took a woman named Connie Babin on their first date to the Port of Call restaurant in the French Quarter of New Orleans. After dinner, the couple left the restaurant to return to Gerardi's vehicle parked around the corner. Three black teenage males approached the vehicle. Gerardi yelled at his date to run away, which she did. As she was running, she turned around and saw one of the teens shoot Gerardi in the face.

Investigation
On March 28, 1995, the police arrested 16-year-old Shareef Cousin, a resident of the city. He had been named by James Rowell, a former friend who was seeking leniency for charges he faced arising from several robberies. Police put Cousin in a line-up and Babin picked him out.

Trial
Babin testified at trial that she was "absolutely positive" that she had seen Cousin commit the murder. James Rowell was also called to testify against Cousin. Rowell was expected to testify for the prosecution that Cousin had bragged about the murder to him. However, when Rowell took the stand, he denied having the conversation with Cousin and instead told the jury that he was only saying what his attorney and the district attorney told him to say, alleging they threatened him with a long jail sentence if he didn't give them Shareef. Rowell also alleged that the prosecutors told him to lie about whether or not he had a deal, noting they scheduled his own hearing so it would not take place until after Cousin's trial, in order to conceal the deal from the defense.

In response, the prosecution called the lawyer and a police detective who was present for Rowell's deposition. Those witnesses testified to what Rowell had previously said.

Shareef's defense team presented witnesses, including two Parks and Recreation supervisors, who testified that Cousin had played in a basketball game in another part of the city and was being driven home by his coach at the time the crime was committed.
There was also video footage of Cousin playing in a basketball game during the time of the murder. Prosecutors argued that the date and time stamp could be inaccurate if it was set incorrectly.

Detective Anthony Small listed two additional witnesses who supposedly positively identified Cousin as the murderer, but they were never called to testify. It later came to light that the detective had lied about having additional witnesses in order to get the warrant.

Cousin was convicted of first-degree murder by the jury and sentenced to death.

Misconduct allegations and appeal 

After the trial, the defense uncovered a number of instances of misconduct by the prosecution. Among them was statement made by Connie Babin on the night of the murder where she explained to police that she did not get a good look at the gunman or his accomplices because of the distance and would not be able to identify him. She also said that she was not wearing her glasses on the night of the murder and could see only patterns and shapes. Other discrepancies also were revealed: She told police the shooter was "slightly shorter" than Gerardi; Cousin is 4 in. taller than the victim. The prosecutors did not disclose these statements to the defense. This information was crucial to the defense, as Babin's identification of Cousin was the only evidence linking him to the murder. The attorneys received the statement from an anonymous source.

The prosecutor also withheld other witness statements from the defense. A local bird watcher witnessed the crime through his binoculars and took down a license plate number. He reported the tip through the Crime Stoppers tip line.

Evidence was also discovered that the prosecution may have taken steps to prevent a number of defense witnesses from testifying. The defense was unable to locate during the trial four witnesses whom it had planned to call to testify. It was later discovered that the prosecution instructed these witnesses to go to the district attorney's office and remain there for the duration of the trial. The location of those witnesses was not disclosed to Cousin or his attorney. Upon questioning, the prosecutor said that he had taken them there for their own comfort as it was hot outside. Time magazine reported that the trial took place during one of the coldest Januarys in New Orleans history.

Cousin filed an appeal, which reached the Louisiana Supreme Court, on the basis of the Brady violations, which is the failure of the prosecution to disclose potentially exculpatory evidence to the defense. His appeal also identified the improper use of the testimony of Rowell's attorney and the police officer. While the use of witnesses to impeach witness testimony is legal, it can only be used to show the credibility of the witness. The prosecutors in this case used their memory of Rowell's earlier statements to attempt to prove Shareef's guilt. Their statements were determined to be hearsay evidence and therefore should not have been allowed.

The fact that the statements by Rowell and Babin, proven to be unreliable, were the only evidence against Cousin led to the Louisiana Supreme Court overturning Cousin's conviction in 1998. It ordered a new trial on the grounds that evidence was mishandled and improperly used by the prosecution. The supreme court referred to it as "a flagrant misuse" of evidence. A few months later, Harry Connick Sr., the DA at the time, decided to drop the case, citing lack of evidence to pursue it any further.

Disciplinary Board

In June 2005, prosecutor Roger Jordan was disciplined by the Louisiana Supreme Court for his misconduct in Cousin's case. His license to practice law was suspended for three months. However, the suspension was deferred on condition of good conduct for one year.

According to defense attorney Clive Stafford Smith, Regina Small told him that her husband, Detective Anthony Small, who was involved in the Cousin case, had called the Crime Stoppers tip line to report Cousin after police had already identified the teen as a suspect. This led to the arrest of the teen. The detective collected the $10,500 reward.

Civil suit
Cousin filed a civil suit against a number of employees of the police department and district attorney's office. He alleged a number of violations of his civil rights. He alleged that the prosecution withheld a number of exculpatory statements, coerced and intimidated Rowell, and took steps to prevent his own defense witnesses from testifying on his behalf by illegally detaining them. The courts ruled against him on the basis that prosecutors have absolute immunity.

See also
List of revoked death sentences
List of exonerated death row inmates
List of wrongful convictions in the United States

References

External links
 TIME Magazine article
"Interview with Neal Conan", NPR

Overturned convictions in the United States
Living people
American people wrongfully convicted of murder
1979 births